Shahrak District is located in the western part of Ghor province, Afghanistan. The population is 58,200. The district center is Dahan-e Falezak.

Economy 
The district suffers from a weak economy and severe poverty due to lack of road linkage between villages and district centre, low level of agriculture and livestock productions, inaccessibility to healthcare services and security problems. In 2014, construction work of irrigation projects began in five villages of the district by the Ministry of Rural Rehabilitation and Development (MRRD).
 Main handicrafts: rug weaving.
 Agricultural products: wheat, barley and potato.

Architecture 
Near the village of Jam stands the Minaret of Jam, a historic building.

Climate 
Shahrak features a mediterranean-influenced humid continental climate (Köppen: Dsb) with warm summers and cold, snowy winters.

References

External links 
 Map of Settlements IMMAP, August 2011

Districts of Ghor Province